The City Is Alive Tonight...Live In Baltimore is a live album by Dog Fashion Disco released on January 25, 2005. It was recorded at Fletcher's, a club in Baltimore, MD, on June 14, 2004. It also contains the bonus DVD, DFD-Day, a recording of the day of the show, the show itself, the party afterwards, and the next morning. The songs "Worm in a Dog's Heart", "Rapist Eyes", "G Eye Joe" & Breed, however, are not present in the DVD, only in the CD. DFD-DAY was directed by Justin McConnell, and partially inspired the production of the feature documentary Working Class Rock Star. The album was re-released in 2006 through Rotten Records.

Track listing

All songs except "Breed" written by Dog Fashion Disco. "Breed" is credited as words by Kurt Cobain and music by Nirvana.

Credits
Todd Smith - Vocals
Jasan Stepp - Guitar
Jeff Siegel - Keyboards
Brian "Wendy" White - Bass
Mike "Ollie" Oliver - Drums
Matt Rippetoe - Saxophone & Flute
Drew Mazurek - Recorder, Engineer, Mixer
Kevin Kelch - Assistant Engineer
Joe Lambert - Mastering
Eric Cole - A&R
Derek Brewer - Management
Jeff Cohen, Esq. - Legal
John Jones - Art Direction & Design
Wendy Jones - Art Direction & Design
Amy Weiser - Photography
Mike Kelley - Booking
Eric Cole - Project Coordinator
Unstable Ground - DVD production company
Justin McConnell - DVD author/director
Tom Gregg - Cameraman
Greg Sommer - Cameraman
Dylan Harrison - Cameraman

References

External links
"DFD-Day" IMDb page
Unstable Ground - "DFD-Day" Production Company

Dog Fashion Disco albums
2005 live albums
Artemis Records live albums